Jackson DeForest Kelley (January 20, 1920 – June 11, 1999), known to colleagues as "Dee", was an American actor, screenwriter, poet, and singer.

Early life

Kelley was born in Atlanta, Georgia, the son of Clora (née Casey) and Ernest David Kelley,  a Baptist minister of Irish ancestry. Kelley was named after pioneering electronics engineer Lee de Forest. He later named his Star Trek character's father "David" after his own father. Kelley had an older brother, Ernest Casey Kelley. Kelley was immersed in his father's mission (church) in Conyers, Georgia, and told his father that failure would mean "wreck and ruin".

Before the end of his first year at Conyers, Kelley was regularly putting to use his musical talents, and often sang solo in morning church services. Kelley wanted to become a doctor like his uncle, but his family could not afford to send him to medical school. He began singing on local radio shows, including an appearance on WSB AM in Atlanta. As a result of Kelley's radio work, he won an engagement with Lou Forbes and his orchestra at the Paramount Theater.

In 1934, the family left Conyers for Decatur, Georgia. He attended the Decatur Boys High School, where he played on the Decatur Bantams baseball team. Kelley also played football and other sports. Before his graduation in 1938, Kelley got a job as a drugstore car hop. He spent his weekends working in the local theaters.

He made his film debut in New Moon (1940), and nearly secured the lead role in This Gun for Hire (1942), but Alan Ladd was chosen instead.

During World War II, Kelley served as an enlisted man in the United States Army Air Forces from March 10, 1943, to January 28, 1946, assigned to the First Motion Picture Unit with the rank of private first class. After an extended stay in Long Beach, California, Kelley decided to pursue an acting career and relocate to Southern California permanently, living for a time with his uncle Casey. He worked as an usher in a local theater to earn enough money for the move. Kelley's mother encouraged her son in his new career goal, but his father disliked the idea. While in California, Kelley was spotted by a Paramount Pictures scout while doing a United States Navy training film.

In 1945, Kelley married Carolyn Charlotte Meagher Dowling. They had no children.

Career

Early roles

Kelley's acting career began with the feature film Fear in the Night in 1947. The low-budget movie was a hit, bringing him to the attention of a national audience and giving Kelley reason to believe he would soon become a star. His next role, in Variety Girl, established him as a leading actor and resulted in the founding of his first fan club. Kelley did not become a leading man, however, and his wife Carolyn and he decided to move to New York City. He found work on stage and on live television, but after three years in New York, the Kelleys returned to Hollywood.

In California, he received a role in an installment of You Are There, anchored by Walter Cronkite. He played ranch owner Bob Kitteridge in the 1949 episode "Legion of Old Timers" of the television series The Lone Ranger. This led to an appearance in Gunfight at the O.K. Corral as Morgan Earp (brother to Burt Lancaster's Wyatt Earp). This role led to three movie offers, including Warlock with Henry Fonda and Anthony Quinn.

DeForest Kelley appeared in three episodes of the television series Science Fiction Theatre. In 1957, he had a small role as a Southern officer in Raintree County, a Civil War film directed by Edward Dmytryk, alongside Elizabeth Taylor, Montgomery Clift, and Lee Marvin. He also appeared in leading roles as a U.S. Navy submarine captain in the World War II-set television series, The Silent Service. He appeared in season one, episode five, "The Spearfish Delivers", as Commander Dempsey, and in the first episode of season two, "The Archerfish Spits Straight", as Lieutenant Commander Enright. His future Star Trek co-star Leonard Nimoy also appeared in two different episodes of the series around the same time.

Kelley appeared three times in various portrayals of the gunfight at the O.K. Corral; the first was in 1955, as Ike Clanton in the television series You Are There. Two years later, in the 1957 film of that name, he played Morgan Earp. His third appearance was in a third-season Star Trek episode (broadcast originally on October 25, 1968), titled "Spectre of the Gun", this time portraying Tom McLaury.

Kelley also appeared in episodes of The Donna Reed Show, Perry Mason, Tales of Wells Fargo, Wanted: Dead or Alive, Boots and Saddles, Dick Powell's Zane Grey Theatre, Death Valley Days, Riverboat, The Fugitive, Lawman, Bat Masterson, Gunsmoke, Have Gun - Will Travel, The Millionaire, and Laredo. He appeared in the 1962 episode of Route 66, "1800 Days to Justice" and "The Clover Throne" as Willis. He had a small role in the movie The View from Pompey's Head.

For nine years, Kelley primarily played villains. He built up an extensive list of credits, alternating between television and motion pictures. He was afraid of typecasting, though, so he broke away from villains by starring in Where Love Has Gone and a television pilot called 333 Montgomery. The pilot was written by an ex-policeman named Gene Roddenberry, and a few years later, Kelley appeared in another Roddenberry pilot, Police Story (1967), that was again not developed into a series.

Kelley also appeared in at least one radio drama, the 1957 episode of Suspense entitled "Flesh Peddler", in which series producer William M. Robson introduced him as "a bright new luminary in the Hollywood firmament".

Star Trek
In 1956, nine years before being cast as Dr. McCoy, Kelley played a small supporting role as a medic in The Man in the Gray Flannel Suit, in which he utters the diagnosis "This man's dead, Captain" and "That man is dead" to Gregory Peck. Kelley appeared as Lieutenant Commander James Dempsey in two episodes of the syndicated military drama The Silent Service, based on actual stories of the submarine service of the United States Navy. In 1962, he appeared in the Bonanza episode titled "The Decision", as a doctor sentenced to hang for the murder of a journalist. The judge in this episode was portrayed by John Hoyt, who later portrayed Dr. Phillip John Boyce, one of Leonard McCoy's predecessors, on the Star Trek pilot "The Cage". In 1963, he appeared in The Virginian episode "Man of Violence" as a "drinking" cavalry doctor with Leonard Nimoy as his patient (Nimoy's character did not survive). Perhaps not coincidentally, the episode was written by John D. F. Black, who went on to become a writer-producer on Star Trek. Just before Star Trek began filming, Kelley appeared as a doctor again, in the Laredo episode "The Sound of Terror".

After refusing Roddenberry's 1964 offer to play Spock, Kelley played Dr. Leonard "Bones" McCoy from 1966 to 1969 in Star Trek. He reprised the character in a voice-over role in Star Trek: The Animated Series (1973–74), and the first six Star Trek motion pictures (1979 to 1991). In 1987, he also had a cameo in "Encounter at Farpoint", the first episode of Star Trek: The Next Generation, as Admiral Leonard McCoy, Starfleet Surgeon General Emeritus. Several aspects of Kelley's background became part of McCoy's characterization, including his pronunciation of "nuclear" as "nucular".

Kelley became a good friend of Star Trek castmates William Shatner and Leonard Nimoy, from their first meeting in 1964. During Trek'''s first season, Kelley's name was listed in the end credits along with the rest of the cast. Only Shatner and Nimoy were listed in the opening credits. As Kelley's role grew in importance during the first season, he received a pay raise to about $2,500 per episode and received third billing starting in the second season after Nimoy. Despite the show's recognition of Kelley as one of its stars, he was frustrated by the greater attention that Shatner received as its lead actor and that Nimoy received because of "Spockamania" among fans.Shy by his own admission, Kelley was the only cast member of the original Star Trek series program never to have written or published an autobiography; the authorized biography From Sawdust to Stardust (2005) was written posthumously by Terry Lee Rioux of Lamar University in Beaumont, Texas. Kelley regarded "The Empath" as his favorite Star Trek television episode.

Later career

After Star Trek was canceled in 1969, Kelley found himself a victim of the very typecasting he had so feared. In 1972, he was cast in the horror film Night of the Lepus. After that, Kelley made occasional appearances on television and in film, but essentially went into de facto retirement, other than playing McCoy in the  Star Trek film series. By 1978, he was earning up to $50,000 ($ today) annually from appearances at Star Trek conventions. Like other Star Trek actors, Kelley received little of the enormous profits that the franchise generated for Paramount, until Nimoy, as executive producer, helped arrange for Kelley to be paid $1 million for Star Trek VI: The Undiscovered Country (1991), which was his final live-action film appearance. In 1987, he appeared in the first Star Trek: The Next Generation episode, "Encounter at Farpoint", in which he portrayed a 137-year-old Dr. McCoy. For his final film, Kelley provided the voice of Viking 1 in The Brave Little Toaster Goes to Mars. Later in life, Kelley developed an interest in poetry, eventually publishing the first of two books in an unfinished series, The Big Bird's Dream and The Dream Goes On.

In a TLC interview done in the late 1990s, Kelley joked that one of his biggest fears was that the words etched on his gravestone would be "He's dead, Jim". Kelley's obituary in Newsweek'' began: "We're not even going to try to resist: He's dead, Jim". He stated the year before his death that his legacy would be the many people McCoy had inspired to become doctors; "That's something that very few people can say they've done. I'm proud to say that I have". In 1991, Kelley received a star on the Hollywood Walk of Fame. In 1999, shortly before he died, he was awarded a Golden Boot award for his contribution to the genre of Western television and movies.

Health and death
Kelley was diagnosed with stomach cancer in 1997, from which he died on June 11, 1999, aged 79, at the Motion Picture and Television Country House and Hospital in Woodland Hills, Los Angeles. His remains were cremated and the ashes were spread over the Pacific Ocean.

Filmography

Film

Television

Video games

References

Further reading

External links

 
 
 
 DeForest Kelley (1920-1999) New Georgia Encyclopedia

 Amctv.com Article about Kelley's Western Career
 
Interview with Kris Smith who looked after Kelley in his final year – The Spectrum, February 2016.
Interview with DeForest Kelley from KVUE at Texas Archive of the Moving Image

1920 births
1999 deaths
Male actors from Georgia (U.S. state)
American male film actors
American male television actors
Baptists from Georgia (U.S. state)
Deaths from cancer in California
Deaths from stomach cancer
First Motion Picture Unit personnel
Male actors from Atlanta
People from Toccoa, Georgia
United States Army Air Forces soldiers
20th-century American male actors
Western (genre) television actors
Male Western (genre) film actors
20th-century Baptists